Greatest Hits in Japan is a compilation album by English rock band Queen. It was released on 15 January 2020 by Universal Music Group. The album was only released in Japan as a limited edition release.

Background 
As part of their "Rhapsody Tour", Queen + Adam Lambert returned to Japan in January 2020. To mark the occasion, a compilation album was released, featuring twelve Queen songs voted for by Japanese fans.

The voting took place through an online form via a special section on Queen's official Japanese website from 6 to 25 November 2019, where, as a general rule, fans residing in the country were invited to cast their votes for their favourite song by Queen from their 15 original studio albums under the one-person-one-vote principle. All participants were required to choose only one song to vote for from the list of 172 tracks in total.

In total there were 11,988 voters. The CD version of the album was exclusive to Japan, while the digital version was available worldwide. The limited-edition CD also included a DVD including music videos of the 12 songs on the album.

Track listing
All lead vocals by Freddie Mercury, except "39" sung by Brian May.

Personnel
Queen
 Freddie Mercury – piano, synthesizer , vocals 
 Brian May – guitar, piano , bells , keyboards , vocals 
 Roger Taylor – drums, synthesizer , vocals  
 John Deacon – bass guitar, acoustic guitar , double bass 

Additional musicians
 Mike Stone – vocals on "Good Old-Fashioned Lover Boy" 
 Fred Mandel – synthesizer on "Radio Ga Ga"

Charts

References

External links
Greatest Hits in Japan at Queen Vault

Queen (band) compilation albums
2020 compilation albums
2020 greatest hits albums
Universal Music Japan albums